This is an inclusive list of science fiction television programs whose names begin with the letter P.

P
Live-Action
Painkiller Jane (2007)
Pandora (2019–present)
Paradox (2009, UK)
Parallax (2004, Australia)
People, The (1972, film)
Peripheral, The
Person of Interest (2011–2016)
Perversions of Science (1997)
Phantom, The (franchise):
Phantom, The (2009, miniseries)
Phantom Empire, The (1935)
Phil of the Future (2004–2006)
Philip K. Dick's Electric Dreams (2017, US/UK, anthology)
Phoenix, The (1982)
Phoenix Five (1970, Australia)
Planet of the Apes (franchise):
Planet of the Apes (1974)
Saru No Gundan a.k.a. Sci-Fi Drama: Army of Monkeys (1974–1975, Planet of the Apes spin-off, Japan)
Time of the Apes (1987, film, Saru No Gundan compilation, Japan)
Poltergeist: The Legacy (1996–1999)
Power Rangers (franchise):
Mighty Morphin Power Rangers (1993–1995)
Mighty Morphin Alien Rangers (1996, miniseries)
Power Rangers: Zeo (1996)
Power Rangers: Turbo (1997)
Power Rangers in Space (1998)
Power Rangers: Lost Galaxy (1999)
Power Rangers: Lightspeed Rescue (2000)
Power Rangers: Time Force (2001)
Power Rangers: Wild Force (2002)
Power Rangers: Ninja Storm (2003)
Power Rangers: Dino Thunder (2004)
Power Rangers: S.P.D. (2005)
Power Rangers: Mystic Force (2006)
Power Rangers: Operation Overdrive (2007)
Power Rangers: Jungle Fury (2008)
Power Rangers: RPM (2009)
Power Rangers: Samurai (2011)
Power Rangers: Super Samurai (2012)
Power Rangers: Megaforce (2013)
Power Rangers: Super Megaforce (2014)
Power Rangers: Dino Charge (2015)
Power Rangers: Dino Super Charge (2016)
Power Rangers: Ninja Steel (2017)
Power Rangers: Super Ninja Steel (2018)
Power Rangers: Beast Morphers (2019)
Powers (2004, UK)
Powers (2015–2016)
Powers of Matthew Star, The (1982–1983)
Pretender, The (franchise):
Pretender, The (1996–2000)
Pretender, The (2001, first film)
Pretender: Island of the Haunted, The (2001, second film)
Prey (1998)
Primeval (franchise):
Primeval (2007–2011, UK)
Primeval: New World (2012–2013, Canada/UK, Primeval spin-off)
Prisoner, The (franchise):
Prisoner, The (1967–1968, UK)
Prisoner, The (2009, miniseries)
Prisoners of Gravity (1989–1994, Canada, documentary)
Prisoners of the Lost Universe (1983, UK, film)
Privateers, The (2000) IMDb
Probe (1988)
Project UFO (1978–1979)
Psi Factor: Chronicles of the Paranormal (1996–2000, Canada)
Pterodactyl (2005, film)
Purple Monster Strikes, The (1945)
Personal

Animation
Packages from Planet X (2013–2014, animated)
Panzer World Galient (1984–1985, Japan, animated)
Parasyte (2014, Japan, animated)
Partridge Family 2200 A.D. (1974, animated)
Patlabor: The TV Series (1989–1990, Japan, animated)
Pet Alien a.k.a. Alién Bazaar (2005, US/France, animated)
Phantom 2040 (1994–1996, animated)
Return to the Planet of the Apes (1975–1976, animated)
Planet Prince (1958, Japan)
Planetes (2003–2004, Japan, animated)
Plastic Man (franchise):
Plastic Man (2006, pilot, animated)
Plastic Man Comedy/Adventure Show, The (1979–1981, animated)
Mighty Man and Yukk (1979–1980, Plastic Man Comedy/Adventure Show, The segment, animated)
Rickety Rocket (1979–1980, Plastic Man Comedy/Adventure Show, The segment, animated)
Power Team, The a.k.a. Acclaim Masters (1990–1992, animated)
Powerpuff Girls, The (1998–2005, animated)
Pretty Cure (franchise):
HappinessCharge PreCure! (2014, Japan)
Star Twinkle PreCure (2019, Japan)
Prince Planet a.k.a. Planet Boy Popi (1965–1966, Japan/US, animated)
Problem Solverz, The a.k.a. Neon Knome (2011–2013, animated)
Project Blue Earth SOS (2006, Japan, animated)
Project G.e.e.K.e.R. (1996, animated)
Psycho-Pass (2012–2013, Japan, animated)
Psycho Armor Govarian (1983–1984, Japan, animated)

References

Television programs, P